College of Staten Island High School For International Studies (CSIHSIS) is a New York City public high school that incorporates an internationally themed curriculum as well as preparing students for the 21st Century. CSIHSIS originally opened as a Region 7 public high school in 2005 on the College of Staten Island campus and moved to a new building in September 2008 located in New Springville, Staten Island. It was founded through a partnership with The College of Staten Island and Asia Society, with financial support by the Bill & Melinda Gates Foundation ($100,000 a year for the first four years).

The school is currently operating at full capacity and recently graduated its first class of 93 seniors. Students were accepted to colleges throughout the country including University of Chicago, Duke University, Georgetown University, Northeastern University, Iona College, SUNY Stonybrook, Brown University, SUNY Oneonta, McGill University, CUNY Hunter, CUNY Baruch, McCauley Honors College at College of Staten Island, Rutgers University, New York University, Brooklyn College, SUNY Geneseo, Life University School of Chiropractic, Howard, Penn State, and Indiana University.

The school is meant to be a small school under the "small-schools model" the Bloomberg administration has implemented elsewhere in New York City, and it had about 200 students in the 2006–2007 academic year.

Facility

After CSIHSIS moved from its original location on the College of Staten Island campus, it moved into the Jerome Parker Campus on Staten Island. This new, state-of-the-art building was also shared with Gaynor McCown Expeditionary Learning School, Marsh Avenue Expeditionary Learning School, and Hungerford School.

Floor Layout
 Library, gym, auditorium, and main entrance. (Shared floor with other schools on campus)
 Math Department and some Language Classrooms. There is also the main office, well as two auxiliary gyms, as well as the guidance suite (Parent Coordinator, Assistant Principal, Guidance Counselor, SAPIS)
 English and History Departments
 Science and some language classrooms

There is also Floor 0, which is the shared lunchroom as well as the outside promenade.

Administration
The school's first principal, Aimee Horowitz, left a career as an attorney in California in the 1990s to become a school teacher in New York City. In 1999, she became assistant principal of social studies at Edward R. Murrow High School in Brooklyn before taking the job as the founding principal of CSIHSIS. After she left to become Superintendent of High Schools New York City DOE in 2010, Joseph Canale, the previous assistant principal, replaced Horowitz while Lauren Torres became the assistant principal.

School Mission
The school's mission is to "prepare students for college and, ultimately, success in an interconnected world."

Empathy and Pluralism.

College of Staten Island High School for International Studies will create a nurturing educational environment in which students are actively engaged in developing literacy and problem solving skills to succeed in post-secondary education, advanced courses of study and the world of work. At CSI High School students, staff and parents will collaborate to create a vibrant learning community. Students attending CSI High School will participate in rigorous inquiry based instruction and learning that integrates world issues, languages and cultures. The integration of a thorough course of study with internationally themed content coupled with community involvement will provide students with the skills and experiences to be responsible and ethical participants in a global society. CSIHSIS Mission Statement

Parent Association
The school Parent Teacher Association sponsors several annual fundraisers, works with teachers and students to sponsor school-wide events. The PTA also works with teachers and the school administration to see the needs of the students and parents. The PTA also co-sponsors the Morty Horowitz College Scholarship created in memory of Principal Aimee Horowitz's father.

Student body
Students must apply through the New York City High School application process to be accepted at the school. However, to receive priority in admission, students must demonstrate interest and make an informed choice by attending one of the school's open house events. Specific information for the application process can be found at www.csihighschool.org. Although the student body is mostly from Staten Island, College of Staten Island High School also attracts students from Districts 20 and 21 in Brooklyn.

Early Application Problems
During the school's initial 2005–2006 academic year, "despite a requirement for interested eighth-graders to resubmit the high school applications they had turned in months earlier — causing some to risk forfeiting seats at elite schools — 213 students vied for the spots at the School for International Studies," according to The Staten Island Advance.

Academics
CSIHSIS students are expected to follow a rigorous, globally based curriculum throughout their entire experience at high school. This also allows students to take different course that are scarcely available throughout the NYCDOE system, such as Global Technology and International Journalism. Students are also expected to study a second language for a full four years. Languages currently offered are Spanish and Mandarin. While studying a second language, students also have the opportunity for international travel, and can take extra student exchange trips as well. During the summer of 2006, two students traveled to China through scholarships from the China Institute. Two Students also participated in a travel study tour to China through a grant from the Asia Society the following year. On this trip, students accelerated and expanded their study of Mandarin through real-world experience, helped to build houses for some of China's less fortunate, and traveled throughout China. Students have also had the option to travel to various countries including Italy, England, France and Spain. During 2008–2009 school year, students learning Japanese traveled to Japan where they visited a school, participated in a home stay and traveled throughout the country.

Beginning in freshman year, students have the opportunity to take College Now courses. Sophomore students will begin to have the ability to take Honors courses.

"CSIHSIS students participate in project and inquiry based instruction and learning that integrates world issues, global perspectives, languages and cultures into all disciplines" according to an "Annual School Report Supplement" of the New York City education department. Students put in 120 hours of service learning, annually create a portfolio and participate in an internship. "Students take college courses, courses collaboratively taught by professors and teachers, [and] travel internationally."

Special academic programs include AP US History; AP Studio Art, AP Biology, AP Calculus, AP English, International Journalism, Forensics, Statistics, Global Finance, a Percussion Ensemble, a Model United Nations Program, College Now; Architecture, Construction & Engineering Program; an after school Homework Center and a three-week Freshman Summer Academy.

Student Exchange Programs and International Travel
Students have also had the ability to participate in Student Exchange programs. This allows them to experience a different country as well an enable a student from another country to experience their culture and high school. Students have participated in exchanges with various countries, including Germany, France, Spain and Switzerland. Outside of learning exchanges, several educational international trips are hosted by the school each year. Past  trips include Antarctica, Australia, China, Costa Rica, Czech Republic, Ecuador, France, Greece, Iceland, Italy, Japan, New Zealand, Spain, Switzerland, Turkey and the United Kingdom.

The College of Staten Island High School for International Studies is the only high school on Staten Island to host the annual Palazzo Strozzi Foundation Renaissance Award competition. The national competition calls for a scholarly essay written on a given topic about the European Renaissance, followed by a rigorous interview with Renaissance experts from New York University and Columbia University as well as officials and executives of the Palazzo Strozzi Foundation. The school has a national record in the program as being the only school to ever have three student winners in the country. The winners of the competition are awarded a one-month long all expenses paid trip to Italy to study the Renaissance and take classes at NYU's Villa La Pietra campus in Florence. The students live in Florence and visit cities such as: Milan, Venice, Rome, Vatican City, Pisa and other towns in Tuscany. In 2015, the three winning students: Maimouna Faye, Saad Shahid, and Rosina Tenantitla made an appearance at the star-studded 2015 Renaissance Man of the Year Award dinner at the Accademia Gallery in Florence, Italy. The event took place to honor Vicktor Pinchuk as the Renaissance Man of the Year and was enjoyed by Italian dignitaries and foreign leaders.

Outside partnerships
Along with partnerships with the Asia Society and College of Staten Island, as a recipient of a Gates Grant, the school works with:
 UN/USA
 iEARN
 Net Aid
 Kiwanis Club
 World Savvy
 The JCC
 The Architecture, Construction & Engineering Program
 The Brooklyn Home for Aged Men
 St John's University
 Asia Society International Studies Schools Network
 Palazzo Strozzi Foundation 
 CUNY
 College of Staten Island

A more up-to-date list can be found at http://schools.nyc.gov/ChoicesEnrollment/High/Directory/school/?sid=3426.

Extracurricular activities
The school has these clubs and activities for students:

Model United Nations
International Travel
International Film Club
Digital Photography
Knitting Club
Key Club
Girls Learn International
Yoga
Craft Club
Volleyball
Student government
Public School Athletic League (PSAL) sports including soccer, basketball, softball, and wrestling
Tutoring
Boys & Girls Varsity Basketball
Girls Varsity Softball
Boys & Girls Soccer
JSA (Junior Statesmen of America) Club
 Girls Volleyball
Girls flag football

The International Insider
The International Insider is the College of Staten Island High School for International Studies official newspaper. It publishes on a monthly basis with articles from the Journalism Class as well as international reporters invited to write for the paper. The paper currently has 5 content departments consisting of Arts and Entertainment, Opinions and Editorial, International/News and Local News, Sports, and Features. There are also 11 departments for paper staff members, including Multimedia, Business, Layout, Copy Editing, Opinions, Arts and Entertainment, Sports, News, Features, Photography, International editors, News Editors, and Editors-in-Chief. The Insider is an actual class that students may have the opportunity to take during their time at CSI High School. At the beginning of the school year, students will have the opportunity to submit a staff application to the newspaper adviser. From there, it is under the determination of the advisor to assign staff positions to members.

Athletics
In the 2007–2008 academic year, the school fielded junior varsity teams in boys' and girls' basketball, both classified as developmental by the Public School Athletic League, and girls' softball. During the 2008–2009 school year our girls Varsity Softball Team, only in its second year of existence, made it to the playoffs.

CSI High School currently has 8 active PSAL rated teams, with one more currently in developmental stage. The active teams include Boys Varsity Basketball, Girls Varsity Basketball, Boys Cross Country Track, Girls Cross Country Track, Boys Indoor Track, Girls Indoor Track, Boys Varsity Track and Girls Varsity Track, Girls Varsity Softball. The single developmental team is Boys Varsity Wrestling. The school also offers varsity tennis for boys and girls.

References

External links
College Of Staten Island For International Studies
 Inside CSI School Blog
 The International Insider Online Website

Public high schools in Staten Island
University-affiliated schools in the United States
Charter schools in New York City
2005 establishments in New York City
College of Staten Island